The 2022 Grand National (officially known as the 2022 Randox Grand National for sponsorship reasons) was the 174th annual running of the Grand National horse race. It took place on Saturday, 9 April 2022, at Aintree Racecourse in Liverpool, England. The event was sponsored by Randox Health.

The race was won by Noble Yeats, trained by Emmet Mullins and ridden by Sam Waley-Cohen, with final odds at 50/1. Waley-Cohen became the first amateur jockey to win the Grand National since Marcus Armytage on Mr Frisk in 1990, while Noble Yeats became the first seven year old to win the race since Bogskar in 1940. The race was Waley-Cohen's last race before retirement.

Race card 
The 40 runners were finalised at 1pm on Friday 8 April. Three horses declared to run at Thursday's 48-hour declaration stage (Easysland, Lord Du Mesnil and Phoenix Way) were withdrawn before the Friday confirmation, with reserves Commodore, Romain De Seman and School Boy Hours taking their places and racecard numbers. Horses trained in Ireland made up 21 of the 40 runners, the first time more than half the Grand National field were Irish-trained.

Finishing order 

 Source

Non-finishers 

 Source 

Only 29 fences were jumped; what would normally have been fence 19 was bypassed, as medical staff were tending to a horse that had fallen on the first circuit.

Broadcasting and media 

As the Grand National is accorded the status of an event of national interest in the United Kingdom and is listed on the Ofcom Code on Sports and Other Listed and Designated Events, it must be shown on free-to-air terrestrial television in the UK. The race was broadcast live on TV by ITV for the fifth time, and the second year in its current three year deal with the British Horseracing Authority.

The ITV coverage was presented by Ed Chamberlin and Francesca Cumani. Analysis was provided by former Grand National-winning jockeys Sir Anthony McCoy, Mick Fitzgerald and Ruby Walsh. Reports were provided by Alice Plunkett, Luke Harvey and Matt Chapman, and betting updates were provided by Brian Gleeson. Oli Bell and Chris Hughes covered viewers' comments on social media. The commentary team was Mark Johnson, Ian Bartlett and Richard Hoiles, who called the finish for the fifth time. Following the race, Bell and Walsh guided viewers on a fence-by-fence re-run of the race.

Equine fatalities 
Discorama and Eclair Surf were euthanised following injuries sustained in the race. Discorama was euthanised after being pulled up with an injury before the 13th fence; the horse was reported as lame and on Saturday evening trainer Paul Nolan confirmed the horse had been euthanised. Eclair Surf suffered a "traumatic head injury" after falling at the third fence; it was treated on track and at Liverpool University before dying the following morning.

Two other horses had died earlier at the meeting. Solwara One, who ran in the 1.45pm race on 8 April, was the first to be put down following an injury before Elle Est Belle suffered a suspected heart attack, when finishing fourth in the Betway Mersey Novices' Hurdle on 9 April, before the main race.

References

2022
Grand National
Grand National
21st century in Merseyside
Grand National